Huaguang Zhang is an engineer at Northeastern University China in Shenyang, China. He was named a Fellow of the Institute of Electrical and Electronics Engineers (IEEE) in 2015 for his contributions to stability analysis of recurrent neural networks and intelligent control of nonlinear systems.

References 

Fellow Members of the IEEE
Living people
Academic staff of the Northeastern University (China)
Chinese engineers
Year of birth missing (living people)